Virender Sharma (born 11 September 1971) is an Indian former cricketer. He played in fifty first-class and forty List A matches for Himachal Pradesh between 1990 and 2006. He is now an umpire. Sharma stood as an umpire in the Twenty20 tour match between India A vs South Africans on 29 September 2015.

In November 2016 during the Ranji Trophy match between Mumbai and Uttar Pradesh, Sharma was forced to stand at both ends on day 2, after the other umpire Sam Nogajski was taken ill with food poisoning.

In March 2017, he stood in the final of the 2016–17 Vijay Hazare Trophy. On 10 January 2020, he stood in his first Twenty20 International (T20I) match, in the fixture between India and Sri Lanka. One week later, on 17 January 2020, he stood in his first One Day International (ODI) match, in the fixture between India and Australia.

In January 2021, the International Cricket Council (ICC) named him as one of the on-field umpires for the second Test match between India and England. On 13 February 2021, he stood in his first Test as an onfield umpire, between India and England.

In January 2023, he was named as one of the on-field umpires for the 2023 ICC Under-19 Women's T20 World Cup.

See also
 List of Test cricket umpires
 List of One Day International cricket umpires
 List of Twenty20 International cricket umpires

References

External links
 

1971 births
Living people
Indian cricketers
Indian cricket umpires
Indian Test cricket umpires
Indian One Day International cricket umpires
Indian Twenty20 International cricket umpires
Himachal Pradesh cricketers
People from Hamirpur, Himachal Pradesh